Bucin may refer to several villages:

 Bucin, a village in Joseni Commune, Harghita County, Romania
 Bucin (Bucsin), a village in Praid Commune, Harghita County, Romania
Bučin, a village in the Kruševo district of the Republic of Macedonia